Dabiran (also Romanized as Dobīrān ; also known as Dowbarān, Dowborān, Dabīrān, Doborān, Dooban, Dowbān, and Dūborān) is a city in the Central District of Zarrin Dasht County, Fars Province, Iran.  At the 2006 census, its population was 9,897, in 2,119 families.

References

Populated places in Zarrin Dasht County
Cities in Fars Province